MediaCorp Channel 8's television series Blessings is a time-travelling drama series produced by MediaCorp Singapore in 2014. The series tells a story of a pastry-maker in 1948 who accidentally time-travelled to 2014 Singapore and helps to salvage the family business back on the right track, and finds love in the modern world.

As of 19 August 2014, all 20 episodes of Blessings have been aired on MediaCorp Channel 8.

Episodic guide

See also
 List of MediaCorp Channel 8 Chinese Drama Series (2010s)
 Blessings

References

Lists of Singaporean television series episodes